Miary Lamatihy is a town and commune in Madagascar. It belongs to the district of Sakaraha, which is a part of Atsimo-Andrefana Region. The population of the commune was estimated to be approximately 3,000 in 2001 commune census.

Only primary schooling is available. The majority 70% of the population of the commune are farmers, while an additional 25% receives their livelihood from raising livestock. The most important crop is cotton, while other important products are cassava, lima beans and rice.  Services provide employment for 5% of the population.

References and notes 

Populated places in Atsimo-Andrefana